"Thursday's Child" is a song by British singer-songwriter Tanita Tikaram, released in 1990 as the third and last single from her second studio album The Sweet Keeper. A remixed version of the song was made for its release as a single.

Critical reception
On its release as a single, Robin Smith of Record Mirror described the song as "utterly and completely turgid". He wrote, "High time Tanita's record company threw a bucket of cold water over her and told her to wake up. She's becoming so introspective that her singles are rambling off into the distance, making no impact at all." Everett True of Melody Maker commented that Tikaram "sounds so middle-aged" and added that the song "isn't bad, it's just so menopausal". In a review of The Sweet Keeper, David Okamoto of the Tampa Bay Times described the song as "Celtic swing" and "reminiscent of Van Morrison's early work".

Track listing
7" single
"Thursday's Child" (New Version) - 3:55
"Once and Not Speak" - 4:45

12" and CD single
"Thursday's Child" (New Version) - 3:55
"Once and Not Speak" - 4:45
"Cathedral Song" (Live in Norway) - 3:23

References

1990 singles
Tanita Tikaram songs
Songs written by Tanita Tikaram
1990 songs
Song recordings produced by Rod Argent
East West Records singles